Herbert John George (6 June 1872 – 4 September 1957) was an Australian politician. He was the Labor member for Adelaide in the South Australian House of Assembly from 1926 to 1933 and from 1947 to 1950.

He was secretary of the Locomotive Engineers' Union throughout his first term in parliament.

His brother, Even George, was also a state Labor MP.
 

|-

References

1872 births
1957 deaths
Members of the South Australian House of Assembly
Businesspeople from Adelaide
Place of birth missing
Australian Labor Party members of the Parliament of South Australia